The XXXX Reserve Corps was a corps level command of the German Army in World War I.

Formation 
XXXX Reserve Corps was formed in December 1914. It was part of the second wave of new Corps formed in the early stages of World War I consisting of XXXVIII - XXXXI Reserve Corps of 75th - 82nd Reserve Divisions (plus 8th Bavarian Reserve Division). It was still in existence at the end of the war in the 6th Army,  on the Western Front.

Structure on formation 
On formation in December 1914, XXXX Reserve Corps consisted of two divisions. but was weaker than an Active Corps
the divisions were organised as triangular rather than square divisions with three infantry regiments rather than four, but had a brigade of two field artillery regiments
Reserve Infantry Regiments consisted of three battalions but lacked a machine gun company
Reserve Cavalry Detachments were much smaller than the Reserve Cavalry Regiments formed on mobilisation 
Reserve Field Artillery Regiments consisted of two  (1 gun and 1 howitzer) of three batteries each, but each battery had just 4 guns (rather than 6 of the Active and the Reserve Regiments formed on mobilisation)

In summary, XXXX Reserve Corps mobilised with 18 infantry battalions, 2 cavalry detachments, 24 field artillery batteries (96 guns), 2 cyclist companies and 2 pioneer companies.

Commanders 
XXXX Reserve Corps had the following commanders during its existence:

See also 
German Army order of battle, Western Front (1918)

References

Bibliography 
 
 
 
 
 

Corps of Germany in World War I
Military units and formations established in 1914
Military units and formations disestablished in 1918